Hymenocephalus is a genus of rattails.

Species
There are currently 27 recognized species in this genus: 
 Hymenocephalus aeger C. H. Gilbert & C. L. Hubbs, 1920 (Plain-tail whiptail)
 Hymenocephalus antraeus C. H. Gilbert & Cramer, 1897
 Hymenocephalus aterrimus C. H. Gilbert, 1905 (Blackest whiptail)
 Hymenocephalus barbatulus C. H. Gilbert & C. L. Hubbs, 1920
 Hymenocephalus billsam N. B. Marshall & Iwamoto, 1973
 Hymenocephalus fuscus P. J. McMillan & Iwamoto, 2014 (Black membranehead) 
 Hymenocephalus grimaldii M. C. W. Weber, 1913
 Hymenocephalus hachijoensis Okamura, 1970
 Hymenocephalus heterolepis (Alcock, 1889)
 Hymenocephalus italicus Giglioli, 1884 (Glass-head grenadier)
 Hymenocephalus iwamotoi Schwarzhans, 2014 (Iwamoto's whiptail) 
 Hymenocephalus lethonemus D. S. Jordan & C. H. Gilbert, 1904
 Hymenocephalus longibarbis (Günther, 1887) (Long-barb whiptail)
 Hymenocephalus longipes H. M. Smith & Radcliffe, 1912
 Hymenocephalus maculicaudus P. J. McMillan & Iwamoto, 2014 (Spotty-tail membranehead) 
 Hymenocephalus megalops Iwamoto & Merrett, 1997 (Big-eye whiptail)
 Hymenocephalus nascens C. H. Gilbert & C. L. Hubbs, 1920 (Nascent membranehead)
 Hymenocephalus neglectissimus Sazonov & Iwamoto, 1992
 Hymenocephalus nesaeae Merrett & Iwamoto, 2000
 Hymenocephalus papyraceus D. S. Jordan & C. H. Gilbert, 1904
 Hymenocephalus punt Schwarzhans, 2014 
 Hymenocephalus sazonovi Schwarzhans, 2014 
 Hymenocephalus semipellucidus Sazonov & Iwamoto, 1992
 Hymenocephalus striatissimus D. S. Jordan & C. H. Gilbert, 1904
 Hymenocephalus striatulus C. H. Gilbert, 1905
 Hymenocephalus torvus H. M. Smith & Radcliffe, 1912
 Hymenocephalus yamasakiorum Nakayama, Endo & Schwarzhans, 2015 (Black-tailed membranehead)

References

Extant Rupelian first appearances
Macrouridae
Rupelian genus first appearances